(S)-Canadine, also known as (S)-tetrahydroberberine and xanthopuccine, is a benzylisoquinoline alkaloid (BIA), of the protoberberine structural subgroup, and is present in many plants from the family Papaveraceae, such as Corydalis yanhusuo and C. turtschaninovii.

Biosynthesis
Metabolically, (S)-canadine is derived from (S)-reticuline, a pivotal intermediate in the biosynthesis of numerous BIA structural subgroups, through three enzymatic steps: 1) Berberine bridge enzyme to (S)-scoulerine; 2) (S)-scoulerine 9-O-methyltransferase to (S)-tetrahydrocolumbamine; and 3) (S)-canadine synthase/CYP719A21 to (S)-canadine.

(S)-Canadine is the immediate metabolic precursor of berberine, which is obtained through the action of the enzyme (S)-tetrahydroprotoberberine oxidase. It is also an intermediate in the complex biosynthesis of noscapine, which is likewise a benzylisoquinoline alkaloid, but of the phthalideisoquinoline structural subgroup.

(S)-Canadine, berberine, palmatine, and hydrastine are the major alkaloids present in goldenseal.

Effects
A number of in vitro effects of (S)-canadine have been reported.  It stimulates myogenesis and inhibits muscle protein degradation. (S)-Canadine blocks K(ATP) channels in dopamine neurons. (S)-Canadine has displayed antioxidant activity: though it lacked any demonstrable cytotoxic effect in three unique cell cultures, it was observed to possess antioxidant activity against free radical-induced oxidative injury. (S)-Canadine can block voltage-dependent calcium channels, but at a level significantly lower than that of verapamil.

References 

Calcium channel blockers
Benzodioxoles
Benzylisoquinoline alkaloids